In the mathematical theory of free probability, the notion of free independence was introduced by Dan Voiculescu. The definition of free independence is parallel to the classical definition of independence, except that the role of Cartesian products of measure spaces (corresponding to tensor products of their function algebras) is played by the notion of a free product of (non-commutative) probability spaces.

In the context of Voiculescu's free probability theory, many classical-probability theorems or phenomena have free probability analogs: the same theorem or phenomenon holds (perhaps with slight modifications) if the classical notion of independence is replaced by free independence.  Examples of this include: the free central limit theorem; notions of free convolution; existence of free stochastic calculus and so on.

Let  be a non-commutative probability space, i.e. a unital algebra  over  equipped with a unital linear functional .  As an example, one could take, for a probability measure ,

 

Another example may be , the algebra of  matrices with the functional given by the normalized trace . A final example is the group algebra  of a (discrete) group  with the functional  given by the group trace .

Definition.  The family   is called freely independent if 

Examples of free independence 

 Let  be the free product of groups , let  be the group algebra,  be the group trace, and set .  Then  are freely independent.
 Let  be  unitary random matrices, taken independently at random from the  unitary group (with respect to the Haar measure). (Asymptotic freeness means that the definition of freeness holds in the limit as ).
 More generally, independent random matrices tend to be asymptotically freely independent, under certain conditions.

References

Sources 

James A. Mingo, Roland Speicher: Free Probability and Random Matrices. Fields Institute Monographs, Vol. 35, Springer, New York, 2017.

Functional analysis
Free probability theory
Free algebraic structures